Alejandro "Álex" Pérez Navarro (born 11 August 1991) is a Spanish professional footballer who plays for CD Lugo as a defender.

Club career
Born in Madrid, Pérez played for no fewer than five clubs as a youth, finishing his development with local Getafe CF, with whom he signed in 2006 from another team in the Community of Madrid, CD Colonia Moscardó. He made his senior debut with the reserves in Segunda División B, only missing nine league games in the 2010–11 season as the side retained their status in their first-ever year in that tier.

Pérez made his official debut with Getafe's first team on 27 October 2010, featuring the full 90 minutes against Club Portugalete in the round of 32 in the Copa del Rey (1–1 away draw and aggregate win). On 16 December he played his first match in the UEFA Europa League, coming on as a substitute for Cata Díaz in the last minutes of the first half of a 1–0 group stage victory over BSC Young Boys.

On 20 August 2013, Pérez was loaned out to Bulgarian club PFC Levski Sofia in a season-long move. After 15 competitive appearances, he returned to Spain in the following transfer window and joined Recreativo de Huelva; he only totalled 110 minutes for the latter, and had a straight red card on his debut, a 2–3 home loss to Real Madrid Castilla on 15 March 2014.

On 24 September 2015, Pérez signed for North American Soccer League side Carolina RailHawks until the end of the campaign. He scored once in five games as his team missed out on the play-offs, his first professional goal concluding their 3–1 home win over Indy Eleven in the last matchday.

Pérez returned to Spain and its Segunda División on 12 August 2016, joining Real Valladolid. He scored his first-ever goal as a professional in his country on 27 May 2017, helping defeat former club Getafe 1–0 at the Estadio José Zorrilla.

In the summer of 2017, Pérez moved to fellow league side Sporting de Gijón. He totalled 60 official matches over two second-division seasons, scoring in a 2–1 away loss against FC Barcelona B on 8 December 2017.

On 31 August 2019, Pérez signed a one-year contract with Arminia Bielefeld of the German 2. Bundesliga. The following 14 August, he returned to his home country after agreeing to a two-year deal with division two newcomers UD Logroñés.

On 20 August 2021, after Logroñés' relegation, Pérez signed a one-year contract with CD Lugo also in division two.

References

External links

Levski official profile

1991 births
Living people
Footballers from Madrid
Spanish footballers
Association football defenders
La Liga players
Segunda División players
Segunda División B players
Getafe CF B players
Getafe CF footballers
SD Huesca footballers
Recreativo de Huelva players
Real Valladolid players
Sporting de Gijón players
UD Logroñés players
CD Lugo players
First Professional Football League (Bulgaria) players
PFC Levski Sofia players
North American Soccer League players
North Carolina FC players
2. Bundesliga players
Arminia Bielefeld players
Spanish expatriate footballers
Expatriate footballers in Bulgaria
Expatriate soccer players in the United States
Expatriate footballers in Germany
Spanish expatriate sportspeople in Bulgaria
Spanish expatriate sportspeople in the United States
Spanish expatriate sportspeople in Germany